Mount Showers is a mountain rising above the Condor Peninsula, 13 miles (21 km) southwest of Cape MacDonald, on the east coast of Palmer Land. Mapped by United States Geological Survey (USGS) in 1974. Named by Advisory Committee on Antarctic Names (US-ACAN) for William Showers, United States Antarctic Research Program (USARP) biologist at Palmer Station in 1975.

Mountains of Palmer Land